Ryan Cochrane (born July 24, 1983) is a Canadian kayaker. He was born in Halifax, Nova Scotia. He competed in K-2 (both 200m and 1000m) together with Hugues Fournel at the 2012 Summer Olympics in London.

On August 1, 2016 (after the suspension of the Russian crew) he was named to Canada's 2016 Olympic team in the men's K-2 200 m event.

See also
 Ryan Cochrane (swimmer)

References

External links
 
 

1983 births
Canadian male canoeists
Canoeists at the 2012 Summer Olympics
Canoeists at the 2016 Summer Olympics
Living people
Olympic canoeists of Canada
Sportspeople from Halifax, Nova Scotia
Pan American Games gold medalists for Canada
Pan American Games medalists in canoeing
Canoeists at the 2011 Pan American Games
Medalists at the 2011 Pan American Games